"Please Don't Ask About Barbara" is a song written by Bill Buchanan and Jack Keller.  The song was produced by Snuff Garrett, and performed by Bobby Vee.  It reached #15 on the Billboard Hot 100, #18 in Canada, and #29 in the UK in 1962.  It was featured on his 1962 album, A Bobby Vee Recording Session.

The single's B-side, "I Can't Say Goodbye", reached #90 in Canada and #92 on the Billboard chart.

"Go Away Little Girl" was a hit for Steve Lawrence on Columbia Records in late 1962, however the original was recorded by Bobby Vee at United Recording Studio on March 28, 1962.

References

1962 songs
1962 singles
Songs written by Jack Keller (songwriter)
Bobby Vee songs
Song recordings produced by Snuff Garrett
Liberty Records singles